John Matchett (born 22 July 1997) is an Irish cricketer. He made his first-class debut for Northern Knights in the 2017 Inter-Provincial Championship on 5 June 2017. He made his Twenty20 debut for Northern Knights in the 2017 Inter-Provincial Trophy on 11 August 2017. He made his List A debut on 18 May 2021, for Northern Knights in the 2021 Inter-Provincial Cup.

References

External links
 

1997 births
Living people
Irish cricketers
Northern Knights cricketers
Cricketers from Belfast